GameRanger is a software for Macintosh and Windows created by Australian developer Scott Kevill, which allows multiplayer games to be played online and provides social features such as chat rooms and voice chat. It was first released for Macintosh in July 1999 and was given the "Best Internet Gaming Achievement" by Macworld Magazine. Windows support was added in 2008 and it currently supports over 700 titles.

Overview
The software is maintained and managed by Scott Kevill. In addition to hosting and playing games the service also acts as a chat room platform. Apple and Bungie ran a competitor platform known as NetSprockets, which later became OpenPlay.

After GameSpy went offline, GameRanger announced that it would support games previously supported by GameSpy.

List of supported games

See also
GameSpy
LogMeIn Hamachi

References

1999 software
Multiplayer video game services
Proprietary cross-platform software